Alisher Karimov (born 1997) is a Tajikistani chess player. He was awarded the title of FIDE Master in 2018.

Chess career
He has represented Tajikistan in a number of Chess Olympiads, including 2016, where he scored 4½/9 on first reserve and 2018 (6/9 on first reserve).

He played in the Chess World Cup 2021, where he was defeated by 1½-½ by Jorge Cori in the first round.

References

External links 

Alisher Karimov chess games at 365Chess.com

1997 births
Living people
Tajikistani chess players
Chess FIDE Masters